Division 1 professional soccer returned to Vancouver in 1974 with the Vancouver Whitecaps as interest began to grow in US soccer, and the NASL grew after stabilizing in terms of attendance and number of teams with six to eight teams.  In 1974 the Whitecaps were one of five expansion teams that were the first teams since 1968 (when Vancouver previously had a team) west of Dallas, Texas and St Louis, Missouri.

The 1974 Vancouver Whitecaps season was the inaugural season of the Whitecaps and their debut season in the North American Soccer League. The Whitecaps were born on December 11, 1973, with the franchise announcement on the top floor of a downtown Vancouver Davie Street hotel. The city had officially amateur teams with regional leagues going back to the 1930s in the Pacific Coast Soccer League.  The city was also home to NASL professional soccer in 1967 and 1968 when the Vancouver Royal Canadians competed at Empire Stadium.

The team played in colours of red and white. Their logo was a standard shield-shaped crest decorated only by a red soccer ball, with a maple leaf in the middle and the words 'Vancouver Whitecaps' above. The Whitecaps hit the pitch on May 5, 1974, with an attendance of 17,343 at Empire Stadium for their first NASL regular season match against the San Jose Earthquakes, losing 2-1 in a shootout.

Jim Easton who had moved from his native Scotland in 1973 to take the 'Caps coaching role after playing the previous season for the Miami Toros, missed the playoffs the first season with a team from the local Vancouver area reinforced with four Scottish players. Locals included players from the University of British Columbia, Pacific Coast Soccer League, and returned local players who had gone abroad to train with European clubs.

Squad 

The 1974 squad

Midfielder Billy Stevenson and defender Sam Lenarduzzi were captains of the 1974 Vancouver Whitecaps.

NASL

League Standings

Western Division 

Pld = Matches played; W = Matches won; D = Matches drawn; L = Matches lost; F = Goals for; A = Goals against; GD = Goal difference; Pts = PointsSource: [1]

Overall 

Pld = Matches played; W = Matches won; D = Matches drawn; L = Matches lost; F = Goals for; A = Goals against; GD = Goal difference; Pts = PointsSource: [1]

Results

Results by round

Match results

Overall

See also
History of Vancouver Whitecaps FC

References

Vancouver Whitecaps (1974–1984) seasons
Vancouver Whitecaps FC
Van
Vancouver Whitecaps